Shaftesbury is a town in Dorset, England

Shaftesbury may also refer to:

Businesses and organisations
 Shaftesbury plc,  a British real estate investment trust 
 Shaftesbury Films, a Canadian media production company
 Shaftesbury High School, in Winnipeg, Manitoba, Canada
 Shaftesbury School, in Dorset, England

Places
 Shaftesbury, Newport, Wales
 Shaftesbury, Belfast, Northern Ireland
 Shaftesbury Avenue, a street in London
 Shaftesbury Park Estate, a housing estate in London, England
 Shaftesbury Settlement, Alberta, Canada

Other uses
 Shaftesbury Theatre, in London
 Shaftesbury, a British merchant ship sunk by Wolfpack Hai in 1942
 Earl of Shaftesbury, a title in the peerage of England

See also

 Shaftsbury, Vermont
 Shaftesbury Barnet Harriers, an athletics club in London